Jamila Fazil gizi Gurbanova (born September 16, 1972) is a professor, Doctor of Medicine, the director of the Scientific Research Institute of Obstetrics and Gynecology of the Ministry of Health of the Republic of Azerbaijan since 2013.

Biography 
Jamila Gurbanova was born on September 16, 1972, in Baku. She graduated from Azerbaijan Medical University in 1995. In 1998 she entered the graduate school at the First Moscow State Medical University.

In 2012, by the decision of the Supreme Attestation Commission under the President of the Republic of Azerbaijan, Gurbanova Jamila was awarded the title of Professor of Obstetrics and Gynecology.

Awards 
 Taraggi — March 2018
 The Name in Science — December 2018

References 

1972 births
Recipients of the Tereggi Medal
Living people
Azerbaijani women physicians
Physicians from Baku
Azerbaijan Medical University alumni